Scott Robert Mills (born 28 March 1973) is an English radio DJ, television presenter and occasional actor. He is best known for presenting the Scott Mills show on BBC Radio 1 from 2004 to 2022 and since then, on BBC Radio 2. Mills has also been a UK commentator for the semi-finals of the Eurovision Song Contest.

Radio

Early radio career
Mills began his career at the age of 16 as a DJ on his local Hampshire commercial radio station, Power FM, after barraging the station with demo tapes. Mills was given an opportunity to present a week's worth of shows, and based on the success of this, he was immediately offered the 'graveyard slot' of 1:00 am6:00 am (six nights a week), making him the youngest permanent presenter on mainstream commercial radio. Mills later moved to the late afternoon 'drive time' slot.

Mills moved from Power FM to GWR FM Bristol, staying with the station for two years, before joining Piccadilly Key 103 in Manchester, starting on the late-night slot before moving to the mid-morning show. In 1995, Mills began to work for the new London station Heart 106.2.

Mills has provided various voice-overs, including the voice of the specialist of the in-store radio station Homebase FM, the voice-over for Blockbuster Inc.'s in-store infomercial channel Blockbuster TV, and the voice-over for The VH1 Album Chart on the UK television channel VH1.

BBC Radio 1

Mills joined BBC Radio 1 in October 1998 to present the early breakfast show which was broadcast between 4am and 7am. In January 2004 Mills moved to a weekend afternoon slot, which was followed by a further move later that year to the weekday early-evening slot which was vacant due to Sara Cox's maternity leave. Cox did not return and Mills became pemament presenter of the early evening programme which was renamed The Scott Mills Show. The programme moved to an afternoon slot in April 2012 when Mills swapped presenting duties with Greg James.

Whilst at Radio 1 Mills also provided holiday cover for other presenters as well as hosting  The Official Chart  between June 2018 and August 2022. 

On 1 July 2022 it was announced that Mills would be leaving Radio 1 after 24 years to replace Steve Wright in the afternoon on BBC Radio 2.

BBC Radio 2
While being a regular daytime show host on BBC Radio 1, Mills did some work on Radio 2 as a cover presenter. 

On 20 March 2017, he hosted a late night show from 10pm to 2am for Sara Cox' Dance-A-Thon. 

On 28 May 2018, he did Bank Holiday Monday show Radio 2 Remix from 4pm till 7. The same day he did a live show on BBC Radio 1 from 1pm to 4, being one of the first people ending a show on Radio 1 and starting one on Radio 2 at the same time. 

In April 2019, Mills was a stand in for Rylan Clark on Radio 2's Saturday afternoon show from 3pm to 6pm.

From 2021-22, Mills was the regular stand-in for Ken Bruce.

On 1 July 2022, it was announced that Mills was to join Radio 2 permanently to replace Steve Wright in the Afternoon, which ended in September 2022. Mills' new show, running from 2-4pm, debuted on 31 October.

BBC Radio 5 Live 
On 17 October 2019, it was announced that Mills and his Radio 1 co-presenter Chris Stark would start hosting a show on BBC Radio 5 Live. The show was part of the station's new weekend line up starting on 9 November 2019. The show was broadcast between 9am and 11am. The final show was on 20 August 2022.

Scott Mills: The Musical
On 14 May 2009, a musical based on Mills' life was announced, to be performed at the Edinburgh Festival 2009. The musical ran for three nights between 11 and 13 August at the Pleasance One Theatre in Edinburgh. The musical was born from an internet rumour that Mills would perform in Rick Rolling The Musical as Rick Astley and other 1980s musicians. He denied this rumour on his radio show, and listeners' suggestions to create a musical based on his life became a reality. Some songs for the musical were composed and sent in by listeners to his radio show. The musical is available for viewing on the BBC Radio 1 website.

Mills did another Edinburgh Fringe show in 2010. He was challenged to do a one-man show, as was his co-host, Rebecca Huxtable, his producer, The One That Doesn't Speak, and ex-Newsbeat sports reporter, Mark Chapman. Mills did his show as 'The Bjorn Identity', the story of Jason Bjorn, essentially, the Bourne Identity to the music of ABBA.

Television work
In addition to his radio work, he has also appeared on various television shows, playing both as a character and as himself. His main acting role was as reporter Paul Lang in the BBC medical drama Casualty, appearing in episodes in both 2006 and 2007. He also had a cameo in the BBC Scotland soap opera River City after praising the show highly on his radio show. He also appeared as a police officer in the Channel 4 soap opera Hollyoaks in 2008. 

Mills has appeared as a contestant or guest on programmes including Mastermind, Supermarket Sweep, Children in Need, Most Haunted and Never Mind the Buzzcocks, and has appeared in the show Identity, hosted by Donny Osmond.

He narrated the music TV show The Pop Years which, coincidentally, was also narrated by fellow BBC Radio 1 DJ Edith Bowman. He has presented high-profile programmes including the Wednesday night National Lottery draw on BBC 1 and his own pilot (featured on the radio show) of Reverse-a-Word. He has narrated Dating in the Dark on Living. In February 2008, he presented Upstaged on the newly re-launched BBC Three. He also hosted a BBC Three television show called Radio 1 on Three, inspired by his radio show.

In February 2011, Mills presented a documentary for BBC Three called The World's Worst Place to Be Gay?.

Mills appeared on series 12 of Strictly Come Dancing and his dance partner was Joanne Clifton, sister of Kevin, who also dances on the show. They came 11th in the competition after being eliminated in week 6.

Mills won, alongside Stark, the first episode of the two-episode Robot Wars: Battle of the Stars (2016) with their robot Arena Cleaner, which was a collaboration with Dave Moulds, who drove Carbide, second place in the preceding series. This was broadcast over the Christmas and New Year period 2016.

Other work
In February 2011, it was announced that Mills would take part in the BT Charity Trek along with other celebrities as part of the 2011 Comic Relief Red Nose Day campaign. The celebrities spent five days in the Kaisut desert in north Kenya, covering  in temperatures up to 40 °C.

On 16 and 17 November 2022, Mills raised over £1 million pounds for Children in Need after riding on a treadmill for twenty four hours.

Personal life
Mills grew up in and around Southampton, attending Shakespeare Infant School and Crestwood College Secondary School in Eastleigh. He currently lives in London.

Mills' parents are separated, although both feature in the show at sporadic intervals.

Mills came out as gay to the press in 2001 to avoid tabloid-style speculation. Occasionally on the show, deflective comments are made, and Mills often jokes that he "doesn't have much luck with the ladies". In his Guardian interview he explained, "I'd just like to be accepted as a normal bloke who is gay and is on the radio and the television." Mills appeared at number 12 on the Independent on Sunday's Pink List for 2010. Mills was the 50th most influential gay person in Britain the previous year.

He was awarded an honorary Doctorate of Arts from Southampton Solent University on 2 November 2009. The bridge that crosses the M3 at Fleet services was officially named The Scott Mills Bridge along with a plaque, on 16 March 2016.

Mills has supported climate change causes such as Global Cool.

In October 2021, Mills announced he had got engaged to Sam Vaughan, his boyfriend of four years.

In November 2022, Mills' 24-hour Treadmill walking marathon with Radio 2 raised over £1.2M for Children in Need.

Awards

References

External links

Scott Mills (BBC Radio 2)
Scott Mills' Wonder Years (BBC Radio 2)

1973 births
Living people
BBC Radio 1 presenters
BBC Radio 2 presenters
BBC Radio 5 Live presenters
English radio DJs
British LGBT broadcasters
LGBT DJs
English LGBT people
People from Eastleigh
Top of the Pops presenters